Old Mishawaka Carnegie Library is a former public library and historic Carnegie library located at Mishawaka, St. Joseph County, Indiana.  It was built in 1916, and is a one-story, Jacobethan Revival style, oriental brick building with terra cotta embellishments.  It features a projecting entrance portico with limestone columns.  An addition was constructed by the Works Progress Administration in 1937.  It was built with a $30,000 grant from the Carnegie Foundation.

It was listed on the National Register of Historic Places in 1998. The building no longer contains a public library. Since 1969, the building has held private offices, a private residence, and in 2018 opened as Jesus Latin Grill and Tequila Bar.

References

Carnegie libraries in Indiana
Works Progress Administration in Indiana
Libraries on the National Register of Historic Places in Indiana
Library buildings completed in 1913
Buildings and structures in St. Joseph County, Indiana
National Register of Historic Places in St. Joseph County, Indiana